Events from the year 1702 in art.

Events
 Completion of the Nyatapola Temple in Nepal by King Bhupatindra Malla.

Paintings

 Ludolf Bakhuizen – The Battle of Vigo Bay
 Ogata Kōrin – Irises
 Sebastiano Ricci
 Allegory of the princely virtues (Schönbrunn Palace, Vienna)
 Assumption of the Virgin (Gemäldegalerie Alte Meister, Dresden)

Births
 July 31 – Jean Denis Attiret, French Jesuit missionary and painter (died 1768)
 August 15 – Francesco Zuccarelli, painter, elected to the Venetian Academy in 1763 (died 1788)
 December 22 – Jean-Étienne Liotard, Swiss-French painter (died 1789)
 date unknown
 Matthijs Accama, Dutch historical and emblematical subjects painter (died 1783)
 Joseph Aved, also called le Camelot (The Hawker) and Avet le Batave (The Dutch Avet), French Rococo portraitist (died 1766)
 Pierre-Alexandre Aveline, French engraver, portraitist, illustrator, and printmaker (died 1760)
 Johann Wolfgang Baumgartner, German painter (died 1761)
 Placido Costanzi, Italian painter of the Costanzi family of artists (died 1759)
 Ercole Lelli – Italian painter of became director of the Academy at Bologna (died 1762)
 Carlo Marchionni, Italian sculptor and architect (died 1786)
 Andrey Matveyev, Russian portraitist (died 1739)
 Samuel Scott, English marine and topographical painter and etcher (died 1772)
 James Seymour, English painter known for his equestrian art (died 1752)
 József Lénárd Wéber, Hungarian sculptor (died 1773)

Deaths
 May 10 – Antonio Gherardi, painter, sculptor and architect (born 1638)
 May 17 – Jan Wyck, Dutch painter of military subjects (born 1652)
 July 22 – Filippo Parodi, sculptor (born 1630)
 date unknown
 Federico Agnelli,  Italian engraver and printer, active in Milan (born 1626)
 Isidoro Arredondo, Spanish painter (born 1653)
 Jan de Baen, Dutch portrait painter (born 1633)
 Nicolaes de Vree, Dutch Golden Age painter (born 1645)
 Marcellus Laroon, Dutch painter and engraver,  active in England (born 1653)
 Didrik Möllerum, Finnish painter (born 1642)
 Bernardo Racchetti, Italian painter  of imaginary vedute (born 1639)

 
Years of the 18th century in art
1700s in art